Little Dewchurch  is a village in Herefordshire, England. The population of the village was 402 as taken at the 2011 census.

Etymology of name
The village takes its name from the parish church of Saint David's which in Welsh is Dewi Sant.

References

Villages in Herefordshire